Riddlesdown railway station is on the Oxted line serving Riddlesdown in the London Borough of Croydon, south London. The station is managed by Southern.

Platforms 
Platform 1 is the platform for trains towards Croydon and London.

Platform 2 is the platform towards East Grinstead.

The station is unusual amongst suburban London stations in that there is no means of crossing between the platforms. The platforms are reached via separate footpaths from Lower Barn Road, either side of the bridge that takes the railway over the road. The ticket office is on Platform 1.

On the London-bound platform 1, there is a staffed ticket office (open for only part of the day) and waiting room.

There are self-service ticket machines and Oyster scanners on both platforms.

Services 
Off-peak, all services at Riddlesdown are operated by Southern using  EMUs.

The typical off-peak service in trains per hour is:
 1 tph to 
 1 tph to  via 

During the peak hours and on weekends, the service is increased to 2 tph in each direction.

These services are operated using  EMUs.

References

External links 

Railway stations in the London Borough of Croydon
Former Southern Railway (UK) stations
Railway stations in Great Britain opened in 1927
Railway stations served by Govia Thameslink Railway